Fort Jefferson is a massive but unfinished coastal fortress. It is the largest brick masonry structure in the Americas, and is composed of over 16 million bricks. Among United States forts, only Fort Monroe in Virginia and Fort Adams in Rhode Island are larger. The Dry Tortugas are part of Monroe County, Florida, United States.

History

Construction 

In late December 1824 and early January 1825, about five years after Spain sold Florida to the United States for $5 million, U.S. Navy Commodore David Porter inspected the Dry Tortugas islands. He was on the lookout for a site for a naval station that would help suppress piracy in the Caribbean. Unimpressed with what he saw, he notified the Secretary of the Navy that the Dry Tortugas were unfit for any kind of naval establishment. He reported that they consist of small sand islands a little above the surface of the ocean, have no fresh water, scarcely enough land to place a fortification, and in any case are probably not solid enough to bear one.

While Commodore Porter thought the Dry Tortugas were unfit for a naval station, others in the U.S. government thought the islands were a good location for a lighthouse to guide ships around the area's reefs and small islands. A small island called Bush Key, later called Garden Key, was selected as the site for the lighthouse, which became known as Garden Key Light. Construction began in 1825 and was completed in 1826. The  lighthouse was constructed of brick with a whitewashed exterior. A small white cottage for the lighthouse keeper was constructed beside the lighthouse.

In 1829, under recommendations from Commodore John Rodgers, the survey ship Florida stopped at the Dry Tortugas to evaluate the anchorage. Contrary to Commodore Porter's experience, Josiah Tattnall III was delighted with what he found. The Dry Tortugas, he reported, consisted of 11 small keys and surrounding reefs and banks, over which the sea broke. There was an outer and an inner harbor. The former afforded a safe anchorage during all seasons and was large enough to let a large number of ships ride at anchor. Tattnall noted that if a hostile power should occupy the Dry Tortugas, United States shipping in the Gulf would be in deadly peril, and nothing but absolute naval superiority could prevail. However, if occupied and fortified by the U.S., the Dry Tortugas would constitute the advance post for a defense of the Gulf Coast. Robert E. Lee, then a Captain in the U.S. army, shared this opinion and in February 1845 penned a letter to Thomas Blake (Commissioner of the General Land Office) recommending the reservation of the Dry Tortugas for military use. Capt. John G. Barnard then made a detailed reconnaissance in November 1844 and on 17 September 1845, the Dry Tortugas became a national military reservation.

Construction of Fort Jefferson (named after the third U.S. President, Thomas Jefferson) finally began on Garden Key in December 1846, under the supervision of 2nd Lt. Horatio Wright, after plans drawn up by Lt. Montgomery C. Meigs were approved in November. Meigs' plans were based on a design by Joseph Totten. Chief of Engineers Totten eventually visited the fort in 1855, accompanying Louis Agassiz.

The new fort was built so that the existing Garden Key lighthouse and the lighthouse keeper's cottage were contained within the walls of the fort. The lighthouse continued to serve a vital function in guiding ships through the waters of the Dry Tortugas Islands until the current metal light tower was installed atop an adjacent wall of the fort in 1876. The original brick lighthouse tower was taken down in 1877.

Design 

Corner bastions, which are large projections designed to allow defensive fire along the faces of the walls they joined, contained gunrooms, gunpowder magazines and a granite spiral staircase. Each tier of casemates contained 150 guns, and another 150 were placed on top of the fort itself. The heavy guns were mounted inside the walls in a string of open casemates, or gunrooms, facing outward toward the sea through large openings called embrasures. The  parade ground contained additional powder magazines, headquarters, a hospital, officer quarters and three large barracks.

The Army employed civilian carpenters, masons, general laborers, and Key West slaves to help construct the fort. By August 1855, 233 white contract laborers were employed, though the slaves "... were the backbone of the labor gang ...," according to Albert Manucy. Bricks were provided by the Pensacola firm of Raiford and Abercrombie. In 1859, the scientist Joseph Bassett Holder assumed responsibility as the fort's physician.

In order to support such a large population in an area lacking fresh water, an innovative system of cisterns was built into the walls of the fort. Sand-filled columns were placed at regular intervals in the inner walls, spanning their height from the roof to the foundation. The columns were intended to filter rainwater from the rooftop for long-term storage in a series of underground chambers. However, the rainwater dissolved salts in the sand, or the cisterns had not been made tight, making the water unfit for drinking, but usable for washing and cooking. Only the rainwater runoff stored under the parade ground was fresh for drinking. Two steam condensers distilled  of sea water per day during the Civil War. The fort enjoyed "... much better water than we have had heretofore," which was stored in the parade ground cisterns.

Civil War 
At the onset of the Civil War, 62 men of the Second U.S. Artillery Regiment, under the command of Major Lewis Golding Arnold, were moved to the fort, preventing it from falling into the hands of rebel forces. Capt. Meigs took over as the Superintending Engineer in 1860, and worked feverishly to improve the security and defenses so that the fort's heavy guns were first fired on 26 January 1861. The fort had a population of 168 persons at the time, including women and children.

Two companies, 160 soldiers, of the 6th New York Zouaves arrived on 4 July 1861, under the command of Col. Bill Wilson. The 7th New Hampshire Volunteer Infantry arrived in March 1862, under the command of Col. Haldimand S. Putnam, to relieve the Zouaves. The 90th New York Volunteer Infantry Regiment, under the command of Lt. Col. Louis W. Tinelli relieved the New Hampshire soldiers in June 1862. They were relieved by the 47th Pennsylvania Infantry Regiment in December 1862. They were relieved in March 1864 by the 110th New York Volunteer Infantry.

In September 1861, the first prisoner soldiers appeared, those sentenced by Courts-martial to confinement and hard labor for acts such as mutinous conduct. President Lincoln then substituted imprisonment on the Dry Tortugas, in lieu of execution, for those found guilty of desertion. By June 1863, only 22 black workers remained following the Emancipation Proclamation. By November 1863, the number of military convicts reached 214, meeting the demands for unskilled labor, and the ratio of soldier to prisoners was about four to one. In June 1864, the ratio was almost equal, with 653 soldiers and 753 convicts. In November 1864, only 583 soldiers guarded 882 prisoners and eight were able to escape.

Post Civil War 

On 24 July 1865 four special civilian prisoners arrived. These were Samuel Mudd, Edman Spangler, Samuel Arnold and Michael O'Laughlen, who had been convicted of conspiracy in the assassination of President Abraham Lincoln. Mudd attempted to stowaway on a steam transport, when the 82nd U.S. Colored Troops relieved the 161st New York Volunteer Infantry Regiment on 25 September 1865. This led to his detention in the fort's "dungeon," over which were the words "Whoso entereth here leaveth all hope behind" (from Canto III of Dante's Inferno). Another state prisoner, Col. George St. Leger Grenfell arrived on 8 October 1865.

In November 1865, the 5th U.S. Artillery arrived and in December 1865, there were a total of 470 soldiers and 273 prisoners. By February 1866, the prisoners were reduced to 207, and to 193 by May. Construction came to a near halt that summer and only 56 prisoners remained in January 1867. The 3rd U.S. Artillery replaced the 5th in 1869.

Mudd helped provide medical care during a yellow fever epidemic at the fort in 1867. The epidemic killed many prisoners, including O'Laughlen, and Joseph Sim Smith, the 5th Artillery's surgeon. A monument to Smith and his son is still present on the parade grounds. Mudd, Arnold and Spangler were pardoned by President Andrew Johnson and released.

The seawall was finally completed in 1872 and six  Rodman guns were in place on barbette (third) tier. The total number of large-caliber guns was 243. The guns were never fired.

Frequent hurricanes and yellow fever epidemics convinced the War Department to remove the garrison, leaving a small caretaker force for the armaments and ammunition in 1874. In 1889, the Army turned the fort over to the Marine Hospital Service to be operated as a quarantine station. The U.S. Navy used the Key as a coaling station.

Neglected, stripped by vandals, swept by repeated tropical storms that crushed brick and concrete and bent girders, Fort Jefferson deteriorated rapidly. It remained unoccupied until war with Spain broke out in 1898. The American fleet was stationed there. One of the ships to load coal there was the USS Maine before her fateful trip to Havana.

In 1902, the property was transferred to the Navy Department, and coal rigs and water distilling plants were built. When these were destroyed by hurricanes in 1906, the fort was again abandoned. Two years later the entire group of islands was set aside as a Federal bird reservation. Until 1934 Garden Key and the crumbling ruins were merely a rendezvous for fishermen and tourists.

During WWI, the lighthouse was decommissioned, but a wireless station and naval seaplane facility was operational.

Park designation 
On January 4, 1935, President Franklin D. Roosevelt, designated the area as Fort Jefferson National Monument. Between 1935 and 1938 the Works Progress Administration performed structural renovation and historic preservation work on site. It was listed on the National Register of Historic Places on November 10, 1970.

On October 26, 1992, the Dry Tortugas, including Fort Jefferson, was established as a National Park.

Accessibility 
Fort Jefferson can be reached by a daily ferry from Key West, as well as by chartered seaplane and private boat. As a national park, primitive camping is permitted on the beach. Visitors by ferry typically spend four hours on the island, which is enough time for a guided tour of the fort, lunch on the boat and a swim (snorkel equipment provided) on the reef. The fort also features a museum and bookstore.

See also
 Dry Tortugas Ferry to Fort Jefferson
 Dry Tortugas Light
 Jack Tier

References

Further reading

External links

 
 
 Historic American Buildings Survey (HABS) documentation:
 
 
 
 
 
 

Former populated places in Monroe County, Florida
Ghost towns in Florida
National Register of Historic Places in Monroe County, Florida
Government buildings completed in 1847
Infrastructure completed in 1847
Dry Tortugas National Park
Historic American Buildings Survey in Florida
Sea forts
Populated coastal places in Florida on the Atlantic Ocean
Jefferson
Jefferson
Historic districts on the National Register of Historic Places in Florida
1847 establishments in Florida
Assassination of Abraham Lincoln
National Register of Historic Places in national parks